Events in the year 1947 in Spain.

Incumbents
Caudillo: Francisco Franco

Births
September 7 - Rosa Conde.

Deaths
July 18 - Amadeo García. (b. 1887)

See also
List of Spanish films of the 1940s

References

 
Years of the 20th century in Spain
1940s in Spain
Spain
Spain